Jiang Dongxu (born March 3, 1993) is a Chinese curler from Harbin. He represented China at the 2022 Winter Olympics as the alternate on the Chinese men's team skipped by Ma Xiuyue. He also won a silver medal at the 2018 Pacific-Asia Curling Championships.

Career
Jiang represented China twice at the World Junior Curling Championships in 2012 and 2013. His team finished 4–5 at the 2012 World Junior Curling Championships and 1–8 at the 2013 World Junior Curling Championships. Also during his junior career, Jiang won the 2012 Pacific-Asia Junior Curling Championships playing second for Ma Xiuyue.

Jiang's most successful season came during the 2017–18 season when he played second for Team Liu Riu. The team won two tour events, the Direct Horizontal Drilling Fall Classic and the Challenge de Curling de Gatineau. They also played in three Grand Slam of Curling events, reaching the quarterfinals of the 2017 GSOC Tour Challenge Tier 2. At the Olympic Qualification Event, the team was unable to qualify for the 2018 Winter Olympics, posting a 4–3 record.

As alternate for the Zou Qiang rink, Jiang represented China at the 2018 Pacific-Asia Curling Championships. There, the Chinese rink posted an 8–0 round robin record and won their semifinal 9–6 over South Korea's Kim Soo-hyuk. In the final, the team came up short, losing to Japan's Yuta Matsumura 9–7. The following month, Team Zou posted a 3–3 record at the second leg of the Curling World Cup event.

After taking a few seasons off, Jiang was selected to be the alternate on the Chinese men's team for the 2022 Winter Olympics, held in Beijing. The team also included skip Ma Xiuyue, Zou Qiang, Wang Zhiyu and Xu Jingtao. Despite not playing a single international competition before the Games, the team fared quite well, finishing the round robin with a 4–5 record. This included defeating higher-seeded teams such as Switzerland's Peter de Cruz, Norway's Steffen Walstad, and Italy's Joël Retornaz. Ultimately, they finished in a four-way tie for fifth place; however, their head to head wins over Switzerland and Norway placed them alone in fifth place at the end of the competition.

Teams

References

External links

1993 births
Living people
Chinese male curlers
Curlers at the 2022 Winter Olympics
Olympic curlers of China